Roel van Hemert (born 21 November 1984 in Hurwenen, Gelderland) is a Dutch footballer who currently plays for ASV Geel in Belgium. Besides the Netherlands, he has played in Belgium and Denmark.

References

External links
 

1984 births
Living people
Dutch footballers
Dutch expatriate footballers
Van Hemert, Roel
Expatriate men's footballers in Denmark
Van Hemert, Roel
Van Hemert, Roel
Van Hemert, Roel
Vendsyssel FF players
Van Hemert, Roel
Van Hemert, Roel
People from Maasdriel
Van Hemert, Roel
Van Hemert, Roel
Association football defenders
Footballers from Gelderland
Dutch expatriate sportspeople in Belgium
Dutch expatriate sportspeople in Denmark